Uncorrected Personality Traits is a compilation album by Robyn Hitchcock, released in 1997 on Rhino Records. Following A&M's 1996 Greatest Hits, this compilation was assembled from earlier, pre-A&M recordings, spanning 1981 to 1995 and selected personally by Hitchcock.

There are no previously unreleased tracks on the collection, and the title itself comes from one of his early solo recordings, made as an a cappella psycho-analytic comedy number for I Often Dream Of Trains.

The album includes three instrumentals and mixes solo work with tracks recorded by Robyn Hitchcock & The Egyptians in the 1980s.

Track listing 

Bass
Fifty Two Stations
Acid Bird
Egyptian Cream
Uncorrected Personality Traits
Heart Full Of Leaves
The Man With The Lightbulb Head
Queen Elvis II
She Reached For A Light
Airscape
My Wife And My Dead Wife (Live Version)
Night Ride To Trinidad
Raymond Chandler Evening
Linctus House
Beautiful Girl
Heaven
If You Were A Priest
Autumn Is Your Last Chance
City Of Shame
Nocturne (Demise)

1997 compilation albums
Robyn Hitchcock albums
Rhino Records compilation albums